Viraboury District  is a district (muang) of Savannakhet province in southern Laos. Seponh-Viraboury Airport in this district serves both Seponh and Viraboury.

References

Districts of Savannakhet province